Alex Vinatzer (born 22 September 1999) is an Italian World Cup alpine ski racer. He specializes in slalom and has competed in two Winter Olympics, and three World Championships.

Born in Bolzano, South Tyrol, Vinatzer made his World Cup debut in November 2017 and his first podium in January 2020 at Zagreb, Croatia.

Season standings

Race podiums 
 0 wins
 2 podiums – (2 SL); 14 top tens (14 SL)

World Championship results

Olympic results

References

External links

Alex Vinatzer at FISI 
Alex Vinatzer at Nordica Skis

1999 births
Living people
Alpine skiers at the 2018 Winter Olympics
Alpine skiers at the 2022 Winter Olympics
Italian male alpine skiers
Olympic alpine skiers of Italy
Sportspeople from Bolzano
Ladin people
Alpine skiers of Fiamme Gialle